Sukhee Kang (born 15 September 1952) is an American Democratic Party politician from Orange County, California. From 2008 to 2012, Kang served as Mayor of Irvine, California, the first Korean American to serve as mayor of a major American city. On 6 July 2011, he announced his candidacy for the United States Congress, but lost the election to incumbent John Campbell. In April 2015, Sukhee Kang announced he would run for California's 29th State Senate district outside of Irvine. Kang lost the primary with 26.8% of the vote in the top two primary system.

Early life and education 
Kang was born at Yeji-dong near Jongno 5-ga in Seoul, South Korea, to merchant parents from the city of Kaesong, in what is now North Korea. He served military draft duty in the Republic of Korea Army from 1973-75  and immigrated to the United States in June 1977 from South Korea after receiving his bachelor's degree in agricultural economics from Korea University in Seongbuk-gu, Seoul. When he was in a college, he joined the English debating club named Seoul PTC (Pine Tree Club) and served as the president from 1971-72. He received an honorary doctoral degree in Business Administration from Dongseo University in Busan, South Korea in March 2011.

Career

Early career and activism 
Kang began his professional career at Circuit City as a sales and customer service representative; he worked with Circuit City for 15 years, from 1977 until 1992. Since 1992, Kang volunteered at the Korean American Scholarship Foundation (KASF), the Korean American Community Fund (KACF), the Orange County Branch of Korean American Corporation, and served as the president of the Korean American Democratic Committee (KADC).

Entrance into politics 
Kang first got involved in politics following the 1992 Los Angeles Riots, during which more than 750 Korean businesses suffered extensive losses. Following the riots, Kang took on a more active role in civic and community affairs, and served as Chairman of the Korean American Coalition of Orange County and the Korean American Scholarship Foundation, Western Region.

Prior to his service on the Irvine City Council, Kang was a Governor's appointee on the California Workforce Investment Board and was the Mayor's appointee to the Irvine Finance Commission.

In November 2004, he was elected Irvine City Councilmember, and was re-elected in November 2006. He served twice as the Mayor Pro Tem. Kang served as a member of the Orange County Great Park Board, Orange County Sanitation District Board, Transportation Corridor Agency Board, Executive Steering Committee of the League of California Cities Orange County Division, and Orange County Transportation Authority Measure M Super Committee.

Mayor of Irvine 
In November 2008 Sukhee Kang defeated Christina L. Shea, a Republican councilwoman, with 52.2% of the vote, to become the first Korean American to serve as mayor of a major U.S. city.

Kang was elected to a second term in November 2010 after defeating Christopher Gonzales, a Republican Party candidate, with 63.21% of the vote.

As mayor, Kang backed a $120 million deal with the Orange County Transportation Authority to lay the groundwork for a citywide public transit system.

Kang endorsed the Northwood Gratitude and Honor Memorial and worked to achieve the unanimous Irvine City Council vote for its approval in December, 2009. The Northwood Gratitude and Honor Memorial, dedicated on 14 November 2010, has 5,714 names of U.S. service members that lost their lives in the current wars in Iraq and Afghanistan. It will be updated annually as needed.

Personal life
Sukhee Kang is married to his wife Joanne Kang (née Choi) in 1977.

Sukhee was honored by the Father's Day Council of Orange County as Father of the year in 2012.

Electoral history

References

1952 births
Living people
American mayors of Korean descent
California Democrats
California politicians of Korean descent
People from Seoul
Mayors of Irvine, California
South Korean emigrants to the United States
Korea University alumni
21st-century American politicians